Varuna litterata, also known as the river swimming crab or the peregrine crab, is a euryhaline species of crab native to the Indo-Pacific. It is commonly found in slow-moving or almost stagnant fresh or brackish waters in estuarine habitats.

References

Decapods
Crustaceans described in 1798